Albert P. Sommers III (born May 27, 1959) is an American politician who serves in the Wyoming House of Representatives representing District 20 since January 8, 2013. He is a Republican.

Education
Sommers earned his BS in electrical engineering from the University of Wyoming.

Elections
2012 With Republican Representative Kathy Davison redistricted to District 18, Sommers won the District 20 August 21, 2012 Republican Primary with 1,247 votes (65.8%), and was unopposed for the November 6, 2012 General election, winning with 3,467 votes.

References

External links
Official page at the Wyoming Legislature
Campaign site
 

|-

|-

1959 births
21st-century American politicians
Living people
Place of birth missing (living people)
People from Sublette County, Wyoming
Republican Party members of the Wyoming House of Representatives
University of Wyoming alumni